The Diamond Queen is a 1921 American adventure film serial directed by Edward A. Kull. The film is considered to be lost. The creator of the story Jacques Futrelle was lost in the Titanic disaster in 1912.

Cast
 Eileen Sedgwick as Doris Harvey
 George Chesebro as Bruce Weston
 Frank Clark as Julius Zeidt (credited as Frank Clarke)
 Burton S. Wilson as John Harvey (credited as Burton Wilson)
 Alfred Fisher as Professor Harvey
 Josephine Scott as Aline Earl
 Lew Short as Reitman (credited as Lou Short)
 Albert J. Smith as Professor Ramsey (credited as Al Smith)

Chapter titles
Vow of Vengeance
Plunge of Doom
Perils of the Jungle
Fires of Hate
Tide of Destiny
The Colossal Game
An Amazing Ultimatum
In Merciless Clutches
A Race with Rogues
The Betrayal
In Torture's Grip
The Kidnapping
Weird Walls
The Plunge
The Decoy
The Dip of Death
The Hand of Fate
The Hour of Reckoning

See also
 List of film serials
 List of film serials by studio

References

External links

1921 films
1921 adventure films
American silent serial films
American black-and-white films
Universal Pictures film serials
Films directed by Edward A. Kull
Lost American films
American adventure films
1920s American films
Silent adventure films
1920s English-language films